Albertus Nicolaas Johannes Bakker (3 January 1936 – 21 November 1969) was a Dutch painter. Bakker was born in Amsterdam and studied there at the Rijksakademie van beeldende kunsten. He was a pupil of Otto B. de Kat and Gé Röling. He became a teacher at the same institution in 1967 and taught Joost Barbiers.

Bakker worked in Amsterdam and Nieuwkoop. In 1961, he won the Prix de Rome. He worked in Switzerland for a year where he met Walter Clénin and made gouaches. He also made gouache paintings of IJmuiden, Amsterdam and later Nieuwkoop. He made a series of gouaches for a topographical atlas of Amsterdam and of the Delta Works for the Directorate-General for Public Works and Water Management.

Bakker died in 1969 in the hospital of Meppel, as a result of a car crash. He had a wife and four children.

References

External links 
 www.rijksmuseum.nl , works of Bakker in the collection of the Rijksmuseum
 beeldbank.amsterdam.nl , works of Bakker in the Amsterdam City Archives

1936 births
1969 deaths
Dutch male painters
Prix de Rome (Netherlands) winners
20th-century Dutch painters
20th-century Dutch male artists